Luciano Germán Zavagno (born August 6, 1977 in Santa Fe) is an Argentine retired footballer.

Club career

Zavagno has played football in Argentina, France, England, Italy and Greece. In 2010, he signed for Torino of the Italian Serie B.

He started his career in 1994 at Unión de Santa Fe in the Argentine 2nd division. In 1996 the club were promoted to the Primera Division Argentina.

In 1997 Zavagno moved to France to play for Strasbourg and then Troyes in 1999. At Troyes he helped them become one of the winners of the 2001 UEFA Intertoto Cup.

In 2001, he moved to England to play for Derby County where he stayed until January 2004 when he moved to Italy to play for Ancona and then Catania. Derby sold Zavagno to cut the wage bill. In 2006, he played for Ionikos of the Super League in Greece.

Post-playing career
Following his retirement, Zavagno took on a career as a football director. After working at Torino and Chelsea as a scout, he was subsequently hired by City Football Group on a supervising and scouting role for all clubs owned by the holding. Following City Football Group's acquisition of Palermo in 2022, Zavagno relocated to Sicily, as part of the club's managerial staff in charge of transfers and scouting. His role at Palermo was further confirmed following director of football Renzo Castagnini's resignations and the subsequent promotion of Leandro Rinaudo on an interim basis.

Honours
Troyes AC
UEFA Intertoto Cup: 2001

References

External links
 Guardian statistics

1977 births
Living people
Footballers from Santa Fe, Argentina
Argentine footballers
Argentine people of French descent
Argentine people of Italian descent
Association football defenders
Unión de Santa Fe footballers
RC Strasbourg Alsace players
ES Troyes AC players
Derby County F.C. players
A.C. Ancona players
Catania S.S.D. players
Pisa S.C. players
Torino F.C. players
Ligue 1 players
Serie A players
Serie B players
Premier League players
Super League Greece players
Argentine expatriate footballers
Expatriate footballers in England
Expatriate footballers in France
Expatriate footballers in Italy
Expatriate footballers in Greece
Argentine expatriate sportspeople in France
Argentine expatriate sportspeople in Greece
Argentine expatriate sportspeople in Italy
Argentine expatriate sportspeople in England
Naturalised citizens of Italy
Argentine emigrants to Italy
Italian people of French descent